Chicomurex is a genus of sea snails, marine gastropod mollusks in the family Muricidae, the murex snails or rock snails.

Species
Species within the genus Chicomurex include:
 Chicomurex elliscrossi (Fair, 1974)
 Chicomurex excelsus Houart, Moe & C. Chen, 2017
 Chicomurex globus Houart, Moe & C. Chen, 2015
 Chicomurex gloriosus (Shikama, 1977)
 Chicomurex laciniatus (Sowerby II, 1841)
 Chicomurex lani Houart, Moe & Chen, 2014 
 Chicomurex protoglobosus Houart, 1992
 Chicomurex pseudosuperbus Houart, Moe & C. Chen, 2015
 Chicomurex ritae Houart, 2013
 Chicomurex rosadoi Houart, 1999
 Chicomurex superbus (Sowerby III, 1889)
 Chicomurex tagaroae Houart, 2013
 Chicomurex turschi (Houart, 1981)
 Chicomurex vaulberti Houart & Lorenz, 2020
 Chicomurex venustulus (Rehder & Wilson, 1975)
Species brought into synonymy
 Chicomurex problematicus (Lan, 1981): synonym of Chicomurex superbus (G. B. Sowerby III, 1889)

References

 Merle D., Garrigues B. & Pointier J.-P. (2011) Fossil and Recent Muricidae of the world. Part Muricinae. Hackenheim: Conchbooks. 648 pp
Description of two new species of Chicomurex from the Philippine Islands (Gastropoda: Muricidae) with update of the Philippines species and rehabilitation of Chicomurex gloriosus (Shikama, 1977). Venus 73(1-2): 1-14

External links
 Arakawa K.Y. (1964). A study on the radulae of the Japanese Muricidae (2). The genera Vexilla, Nassa, Rapana, Murex, Chicoreus and Homalocantha. Venus. 22(4): 355-364, pl. 21

Muricinae
Gastropod genera